China became a member of the World Trade Organization (WTO) on 11 December 2001, after the agreement of the Ministerial Conference. The admission of China to the WTO was preceded by a lengthy process of negotiations and required significant changes to the Chinese economy. China's membership in the WTO has been contentious, with substantial economic and political effects on other countries (some times referred to as the China shock), and controversies over the mismatch between the WTO framework and China's economic model.

Background 
Until the 1970s, China’s economy was managed by the communist government and was kept closed from other economies. Together with political reforms, China in the early 1980s began to open its economy and signed a number of regional trade agreements. China gained observer status with GATT and from 1986, began to work towards joining that organisation. China aimed to be included as a WTO founding member (which would validate it as a world economic power) but this attempt was thwarted because the United States, European countries, and Japan requested that China first reform various tariff policies, including tariff reductions, open markets and industrial policies.

Preparations 
After the 1997 Asian financial crisis, China sold off or merged many unprofitable state-owned enterprises. In 1998, China reformed the State Council to greatly reduce the mandate of the State Planning Commission and increase the mandate of the State Economic and Trade Commission. This shift also corresponded to the change in premiership from Li Peng to Zhu Rongji, the latter of whom strongly believed that China needed deeper economic restructuring. This restructuring, which had been happening since the 1980s, included crackdowns on corruption and the establishment of chambers of commerce.

The World Trade Organization Ministerial Conference of 1999 and related 1999 Seattle WTO protests were the penultimate step before Chinese accession.

United States' role 
Formal diplomatic relations between the United States and the People's Republic of China were not established until 1979, and even afterwards, trade relations were hampered by the high tariff rates of the Smoot–Hawley Tariff Act of 1930. After the two governments settled asset claims dating from the Korean War in 1950, Congress temporarily granted China most favored nation status in 1980. However, Chinese-American trade was still hindered by the Jackson–Vanik amendment of 1974, which made trade with the United States contingent on certain human rights metrics. The Jackson–Vanik restrictions could not apply, however, to WTO members, because of WTO rules that prohibit this kind of discrimination.

By 1984, the United States had become China's third-largest trading partner, and China became America's 14th largest. However, the annual renewal of China's MFN status was constantly challenged by anti-Chinese pressure groups during US congressional hearings. For example, U.S. imports from China almost doubled within five years from $51.5 billion in 1996 to $102 billion in 2001. The American textile industry lobbied Congress for, and received, tariffs on Chinese textiles according to the WTO Agreement on Textiles and Clothing. In reaction to the 1989 Tiananmen Square protests' suppression, the Bush I administration and Congress imposed administrative and legal constraints on investment, exports, and other trade relations with China.

The Clinton presidency from 1992 started with an executive order (128590) that linked renewal of China's MFN status with seven human rights conditions, including "preservation of Tibetan indigenous religion and culture" and "access to prisons for international human rights organisations"—Clinton reversed this position a year later. Other challenges to Sino-American relations in this decade included the investigations into Chinese nuclear espionage which produced the Cox Report, the persecution of Taiwanese-American scientist Wen Ho Lee for unproven allegations of espionage for the PRC, and the 1999 United States bombing of the Chinese embassy in Belgrade. But relations warmed after the September 2001 initiation by George W. Bush of the War on Terror.

Conditions
These changes were difficult steps for China and conflicted with its prior economic strategy. Accession meant that China would engage in global competition according to rules that it did not make. China's admission was "an enormous multilateral achievement" that marked a clear commitment towards multilateralism.

When China joined the WTO, it agreed to considerably harsher conditions than other developing countries.  After China joined the World Trade Organization (WTO), its service sector was considerably liberalized and foreign investment was allowed; its restrictions on retail, wholesale and distribution ended. Banking, financial services, insurance and telecommunications in China were also opened up to foreign investment. Furthermore, China had to deal with certain concerns linked to transparency and intellectual property that the accession to WTO underlined.

Non-market economy 
Under Article 15 of the protocol by which China joined the WTO, China was recognized as a Non-market economy (NME). This status allows special treatment within the WTO. The status was set for 15 years and has been disputed after 2016, the year when the 15 years had passed.

Other related WTO members 
 Hong Kong was admitted as a WTO member on 1 January 1995,  before Hong Kong was handed over to China in 1997.

See also
 Chinese economic reform
China shock

References

Foreign trade of China
World Trade Organization